Strikeforce: Barnett vs. Kharitonov was a mixed martial arts event held by Strikeforce that served as the Heavyweight Tournament semifinals.  The event aired live on Showtime. The event took place on September 10, 2011, at U.S. Bank Arena in Cincinnati, Ohio, United States.

Background
Ronaldo Souza and Luke Rockhold were rumored to meet at Strikeforce: Fedor vs. Henderson, but the bout was moved to this card.

Alistair Overeem was expected to face Antônio Silva in the semifinals of the Strikeforce Heavyweight Grand Prix at this event. However, on July 18 it was announced that Overeem refused to compete at this event, claiming that a toe injury would prevent him from being ready in time. Alistair Overeem was subsequently removed from the tournament and released by the company, he was replaced by Daniel Cormier.

Gegard Mousasi was originally scheduled to face Mike Kyle at this event, but it was later announced that Strikeforce newcomer Marcos Rogério de Lima would replace Mousasi in the bout. The Mousasi/Kyle fight would eventually take place at Strikeforce: Marquardt vs. Saffiedine in January 2013, where Mousasi won by first round submission.

Josh Thomson was scheduled to take on Maximo Blanco at this event. However, on August 23, it was announced Thomson had to withdraw from the bout due to a foot injury. Pat Healy stepped in as Thomson's replacement.

On August 23, 2011, it was announced that the preliminary card for this show would air live on HDNet. This would be the last Strikeforce event to feature televised prelims on HDNet, with remaining 2011 preliminary bouts not being televised, and future preliminary cards were instead shown on Showtime Extreme.

Results

Heavyweight Grand Prix Bracket

** = Replacement

Alternates
Shane Del Rosario
Chad Griggs

Reported Payout
The following is the reported payout to the fighters as reported to the Ohio Athletic Commission. The salaries listed below do not include fight bonuses, sponsorships, percentages and other unofficial payments. It also does not include deductions for expenses such as insurance, taxes, etc.

Luke Rockhold: $50,000 ($25,000 win bonus) def. Ronaldo Souza: $70,000
Josh Barnett: $150,000 (no win bonus) def. Sergei Kharitonov: $100,000
Daniel Cormier: $100,000 ($50,000 win bonus) def. Antonio Silva: $100,000
Muhammed Lawal: $85,000 (no win bonus) def. Roger Gracie: $80,000
Pat Healy: $17,500 ($5,000 win bonus) def. Maximo Blanco: $13,000
Rafael Calvacante: $60,000 ($30,000 win bonus) def. Yoel Romero: $10,000
Jordan Mein: $16,000 ($8,000 win bonus) def. Evangelista Santos: $20,000
Mike Kyle: $44,000 ($22,000 win bonus) def. Marcos Rogério de Lima: $5,000
Alexis Davis: $6,000 ($3,000 win bonus) def. Amanda Nunes: $7,500
Dominique Steel: $5,000 ($3,000 win bonus) def. Chris Mierzwiak: $3,000

References

Barnett vs. Kharitonov
Events in Cincinnati
2011 in mixed martial arts
Mixed martial arts in Ohio
Sports competitions in Cincinnati
2011 in sports in Ohio